Stripes (Stripes, LLC) is a private equity and venture capital firm based in Manhattan, New York, founded in 2008. In 2021, Stripes had US$7.6 billion of assets under management and 80 investments. Notable investments include On Running and Monday.com.

History
Stripes was founded by Ken Fox in 2008.

Investments
Selected Stripes investments include:

References

External links

Private equity firms of the United States
Companies based in New York City
Financial services companies established in 2008